We Will Rock You is a jukebox musical based on the songs of British rock band Queen with a book by Ben Elton. After We Will Rock You became a hit in London, various other productions were put on around the world. One of the earliest was in Australia with the cast from around Australia and New Zealand.

To help promote this production, a special version of the British musical soundtrack was released to help promote the production.  This edition is noteworthy for having new album artwork and the inclusion of a new recording of Another One Bites The Dust by Queen featuring as vocalist Annie Crummer who played the part of Killer Queen.

This recording was to later receive a single release in New Zealand.

Track listing

Another One Bites The Dust: 
 Lead vocals: Annie Crummer
 Guitars: Brian May
 Drums: Roger Taylor
 Production: Justin-Shirley Smith & Queen

Lead vocals sung by Pop (Nigel Planer), Khashoggi (Alexander Hanson), Gallileo (Tony Vincent), Scaramouche (Hannah Jane Fox), Killer Queen (Sharon D. Clarke), Britney (Nigel Clauzel), Meat (Kerry Ellis)

Music performed by Mike Dixon (piano), Andy Smith (keyboards), Spike Edney (keyboards), Jeff Leach (keyboards / synthesisers), Laurie Wisefield (guitar), Alan Darby (guitar), Neil Murray (bass), Tony Bourke (drums), Julian Poole (percussion)

 Lyrics written by Ben Elton, Brian May and Roger Taylor
 Produced by Justin Shirley Smith and Brian May
 Recorded live at the Dominion Theatre, London, 12 and 13 July 2002
 Mixed by Justin Shirley Smith and Joshua J. Macrae at Allerton Hill and Cosford Mill studios.
 Production tools by Kris Fredriksson and Joshua J. Macrae
 Mastered by Miles Showell at Metropolis Mastering
 Logo designed by Dewynters
 Packaging designed by Richard Gray
 Photography by Catherine Ashmore and Dave Bennett

Management by Jim Beach

References

2003 soundtrack albums
Theatre soundtracks
Cast recordings
Queen (band)
Soundtracks by Australian artists
EMI Records soundtracks